Lumen Technologies, Inc. (formerly CenturyLink) is an American telecommunications company headquartered in Monroe, Louisiana, that offers communications, network services, security, cloud solutions, voice, and managed services. The company was a member of the S&P 500 index until 2023 and the Fortune 500.  Its communications services include local and long-distance voice, broadband, Multi-Protocol Label Switching (MPLS), private line (including special access), Ethernet, hosting (including cloud hosting and managed hosting), data integration, video, network, public access, Voice over Internet Protocol (VoIP), information technology, and other ancillary services. Lumen also serves global enterprise customers across North America, Latin America, EMEA (Europe, Middle East, and Africa), and Asia Pacific.

History 
The earliest predecessor of Lumen was the Oak Ridge Telephone Company in Oak Ridge, Louisiana, which was owned by F. E. Hogan, Sr. In 1930, Hogan sold the company, with 75 paid subscribers, to William Clarke and Marie Williams, for $500. They moved the switchboard to the Williams family front parlor. In 1946, the Williams' son, Clarke McRae Williams, received ownership of the family's telephone company as a wedding gift. In 1947, Clarke Williams learned the telephone company in Marion, Louisiana was for sale. With a loan from business associate Joe Sydney Carter, Clarke purchased the Marion Telephone Company and eventually made it his base of operation as he grew his company through more acquisitions. Lumen still maintains offices in the former headquarters building. The company remained as a family-operated business until it became incorporated in 1968.

1967–1999 
By 1967, Oak Ridge Telephone Company served three states with 10,000 access lines. That year, the company was incorporated as Central Telephone and Electronics. Clarke M. Williams served as president and chairman of the board. Between 1972 and 1975, Clarke gradually moved his headquarters from Marion to Monroe, Louisiana, to access the larger employee base and to be near the airport.

In 1971, the company was renamed Century Telephone Enterprises, Inc. In 1972, Century Telephone acquired the La Crosse Telephone Corporation, of Wisconsin.

On October 24, 1978, Century Telephone moved to the New York Stock Exchange for the first time and began to trade under the ticker symbol CTL.

Century Telephone performed well during the long bear market of the 1970s, as its stock rose over fourfold. The company provided telephone service in parts of 14 states by that time.

In 1981, Century Telephone acquired War Telephone in West Virginia.

In 1982, Century Telephone's earnings peaked at $14 million, then declined in 1983 following the early 1980s recession, and finally began to recover in 1984. However, the 1983 decline led to a loss of half the value of the company's stock in 1984.

In 1985, both earnings and the stock price had recovered to new record highs. But by then, the company had accumulated $206 million in long-term debt. Century Telephone sold the operations of War Telephone and two other companies to Colonial Telephone for $4.66 million.

In 1987, the stock price nearly doubled from its low that year, and from its old 1982 record high, before falling back by a third in the 1987 stock market crash. Earnings had steadily grown each year from their 1983 low, and by 1987 reached nearly US$20 million.

In 1989, Century Telephone Enterprises acquired Universal Telephone, Inc. for US$90 million in cash. During the late 1980s the company began a long trend in which it performed extremely well. The stock split three-for-two twice in this period, as earnings steadily grew, through the 1990-1991 recession, and by year-end 1991, they reached nearly US$40 million, double from what they had been in 1987.

In 1992, Century Telephone acquired Central Telephone Company of Ohio, a Centel subsidiary, for $135 million. The acquisition served more than 65,000 access lines, and added 20% to Century's access line total. Also that year Glen F. Post III became Chief Executive Officer and, named Vice Chairman of the Board of Century Telephone.

In 1993, Century Telephone revenues were over $425 million, up from about $350 million in 1992. 1993 earnings were nearly $80 million, up from about $70 million in 1992, excluding a nearly $16 million charge in 1992 due to the cumulative effect from an accounting change that year. Also in 1993 the company split its stock three-for-two yet again. However, by that time, the company had accumulated nearly $520 million in long-term debt.

By 1995, Century Telephone Enterprises had been added to the S&P MidCap 400 index. Earnings had continued their steady growth trend through the 1994 economic soft landing, and by 1995 they reached over US$115 million. But the long-term debt continued to grow as well, reaching US$623 million that year.

In 1997, Century Telephone acquired Delta Security Alarm Co., Inc. of Monroe, Louisiana, and its largest acquisition up until that time, Pacific Telecom, doubling its size with 660,000 additional telephone access lines in 12 states. Pacific Telecom, Inc., would continue existence and was renamed CenturyTel of the Northwest, Inc.

In 1998, Century Telephone split its stock three-for-two once again. The company acquired another Monroe, Louisiana security company, Century Protection Systems, and also acquired 89,000 access lines and 19 exchanges in 21 northern Wisconsin communities from Ameritech. The affected customers had formerly been served by Wisconsin Bell. Ameritech's directory publishing operations serving those customers were also acquired.

In 1999, the company was renamed as CenturyTel, Inc. It split its stock three-for-two once more, and was added to the Standard & Poor's 500 Index that year.

2000s 
In 2000, CenturyTel acquired 230,500 GTE lines in Arkansas, and also bought 127,000 GTE lines in Missouri in partnership with Spectra Communications. In Wisconsin, it acquired 133,000 additional lines, and 70,500 access lines for US$195 million from Verizon. That year CenturyTel also bought 62,650 lines for US$170 million in partnership with Telephone USA of Wisconsin, LLC.

In 2001, CenturyTel acquired CSW Net, Inc. of Russellville, Arkansas, and fended off a hostile take-over attempt by ALLTEL, Inc.

In 2002, longtime chairman Clarke M. Williams died. He was succeeded by then vice chairman Glen F. Post III. The company sold its wireless business to ALLTEL in order to concentrate on its rural landline business. Also that year CenturyTel acquired 300,000 Verizon access lines in Alabama, and 354,000 Verizon access lines in Missouri, bringing its total operations to 22 states with 2.5 million access lines.

In 2003, CenturyTel acquired half ownership of SkyComm International, Inc. in Houston, Texas, in March, to form a satellite teleport for its global Network Access Point (NAP) system. In June, CenturyTel also acquired the fiber network of Digital Teleport, Inc., a 5,700-mile (9,200 km) route running from Illinois to Texas, and adjoining states. CenturyTel renamed the network company LightCore. Closing out the year, in December CenturyTel acquired the Midwest Fiber Optic Network (MFON) from Level 3 Communications, Inc. in December, a stand-alone system in the same core central states as LightCore.

In August 2004, it partnered with EchoStar Communications Corporation for DISH Network multi-channel digital TV. In September, CenturyTel began a relationship with Cingular Wireless.

In 2005, CenturyTel began a wireless voice and data service, and bought a number of fiber networks in the central United States, from KMC Telecom Holdings, Inc.

In 2006, CenturyTel sold its Arizona assets to Hopi Telecommunications, Inc., bringing total operations to 23 states.

In May 2007, CenturyTel acquired Madison River Communications, based out of Mebane, NC and parent company to four LECs (AL, GA, IL, and NC) as well as CLEC operations in IL, LA, and NC. The LECs included Mebtel Communications, a telephone company serving Alamance County, North Carolina and Orange County, North Carolina and Caswell County, North Carolina near the Virginia International Raceway; GulfTel Communications, based out of Foley, AL and serving Baldwin and surrounding counties; Coastal Communications, based out of Hinesville, GA; and Gallatin River Communications, serving the Dixon, Galesburg, and Pekin areas of IL.

2008 merger with Embarq and name change to CenturyLink 

On October 27, 2008, Embarq announced that it would be acquired by CenturyTel, Inc. in an all-stock transaction valued at about $6 billion. CenturyTel's CEO Glen Post would remain CEO of the merged company following the acquisition, and remained CEO until 2018.  Embarq was the former landline business of Sprint and served cities in 18 states, including Nevada, Florida, North Carolina, and Ohio. The deal made CenturyTel the third-largest landline phone provider in Pennsylvania behind Verizon (through both Verizon Pennsylvania and Verizon North) and Comcast. On June 2, 2009, a press release announced that the combined CenturyTel/Embarq entity would be called CenturyLink. Denver-based Monigle Associates was retained to formulate the new brand strategy. The acquisition was completed on July 1, 2009.

On October 19, 2009, CenturyTel and Embarq brandings were retired, and all business was officially conducted under the CenturyLink banner, continuing to trade on the NYSE under the CenturyTel stock ticker CTL. The new corporate name, CenturyLink, Inc., did not become official until May 2010.

2010 merger with Qwest

On April 22, 2010, CenturyLink (at this point still legally known as CenturyTel, Inc.) announced it would acquire Qwest in a stock-for-stock transaction. Under the agreement, CenturyLink would swap 0.1664 of its shares for each share of Qwest; as a result, CenturyLink shareholders prior to the merger wound up with 50.5% share of ownership in the combined company, while former Qwest shareholders gained the remaining 49.5%. The valuation of CenturyLink's purchase was $12 billion.  The merger was completed on April 1, 2011.

The addition of Qwest allowed CenturyLink to become the third largest telecommunications company in the United States, and the largest landline phone provider in the state of Colorado.  The new company has 17 million access lines, 5 million broadband customers, and 1.4 million video subscribers across 37 states. The merger also made CenturyLink owner of one of the Former Regional Bell Operating Companies: the successor to US West, which had been purchased by Qwest in 2000.

Further acquisitions (2011–2019)
On July 15, 2011, CenturyLink acquired Savvis, Inc., a global provider of cloud infrastructure and hosted IT services for $2 billion, which represented all outstanding shares of Savvis common stock at $40 per share. This acquisition allowed CenturyLink to provide expanded managed hosting and cloud services.

On December 4, 2012, CenturyLink launched an integrated suite of cloud services called Savvisdirect. Savvisdirect was an expansion of CenturyLink's portfolio of Savvis cloud services and includes cloud application hosting, cloud servers, cloud storage, and private cloud for small businesses, IT administrators, and developers. CenturyLink later shuttered the savvisdirect subsidiary, consolidating their cloud service offerings internally.

On October 16, 2012, Savvis acquired the ITO Business Division of Ciber, thereby adding managed services to the portfolio.

On June 14, 2013, CenturyLink announced the acquisition of AppFog, a Portland-based Platform as a Service provider, used by over 100,000 developers to automate the deployment of software on public clouds, such as Amazon Web Services and OpenStack.

On November 19, 2013, CenturyLink announced the acquisition of Tier 3, a Seattle-based infrastructure as a service (IaaS), platform, an advanced cloud management company based on Cloud Foundry.

On December 8, 2014, CenturyLink announced the acquisition of DataGardens, Inc., a Disaster Recovery as-a-Service (DRaaS) provider based in Edmonton, Alberta, Canada.

On December 11, 2014, CenturyLink announced the acquisition of Cognilytics, a predictive analytics and big data service provider.

On March 30, 2016, CenturyLink announced the acquisition of netAura, a security services company that focuses on cybersecurity, security information and event management (SIEM), analytics, and vulnerability management.

On January 9, 2017, CenturyLink announced the acquisition of Edison, New Jersey-based SEAL Consulting, a leading SAP services provider. This expanded CenturyLink's existing integrated SAP capabilities of hosting and managed services to include integration and software implementation.

On October 31, 2016, CenturyLink announced its intent to acquire Level 3 Communications in a deal valued at around $25 billion. After securing the necessary regulatory approvals, CenturyLink closed the transaction on November 1, 2017. This acquisition can now be viewed as a takeover from the inside. Level3 shareholders would only approve the deal if CenturyLink retired their CFO and eventually CEO. Eventually all former CenturyLink executives would be replaced by former Level3 managers leaving only HR and legal executives in place.

On September 10, 2019, CenturyLink announced the acquisition of Streamroot, a provider of technology to improve video and static content delivery within bandwidth constrained areas.

2020 name change to Lumen 
On September 14, 2020, CenturyLink, Inc announced that it had changed its name to Lumen Technologies, Inc. Effective with the opening of the trading day on Sept. 18, 2020, the company stock ticker changed from CTL to LUMN. The CenturyLink brand will continue to be the customer-facing brand for traditional copper-based services. Fiber-based products and services will use the brand Quantum Fiber.

2021 ILEC asset sale
On August 3, 2021, Lumen announced it would sell its incumbent local exchange carrier (ILEC) operations in 20 states to Apollo Global Management for $7.5 billion. The assets being sold are located in Alabama, Arkansas, Georgia, Illinois, Indiana, Kansas, Louisiana, Michigan, Mississippi, Missouri, New Jersey, North Carolina, Ohio, Oklahoma, Pennsylvania, South Carolina, Tennessee, Texas, Virginia, and Wisconsin. Lumen will retain operations in 16 states, including Florida, Nevada, and the states formerly served by Qwest: Arizona, Colorado, Idaho, Iowa, Minnesota, Montana, Nebraska, New Mexico, North Dakota, Oregon, South Dakota, Utah, Washington, and Wyoming. The sale closed in October 2022; the sold ILEC operations were rebranded as Brightspeed.

Products and services

Lumen's products and services focus on three segments: enterprise business, small business, and residential.

Lumen enterprise business 
Lumen Enterprise Business provides products and services around network, cloud, security, voice, and managed services to enterprise customers. Lumen's network services include SD-WAN, MPLS/IPVPN, hybrid WAN, Ethernet, Internet access, wavelength services, dark fiber, and private lines. Lumen Cloud provides big data as a service, Internet of Things (IoT), multi-cloud management, private cloud, public cloud, bare metal, SaaS applications, and cloud connect. Lumen Security monitors more than a billion security events daily. Services include: cloud, infrastructure, DDoS, web application, email, and web security. The company also provides analytics and threat management, risk and compliance support, and threat research labs. CenturyLink offers voice products ranging from traditional landlines to unified communications and collaboration (UC&C) services and was recognized in 2018 by Frost & Sullivan for “growth excellence in VoIP access and SIP trunking”. Lumen's managed services include advanced professional services, IT consulting, and strategic partnerships.

Lumen content delivery network 
Lumen is a global content delivery network (CDN) with 170 Tbit/s of global edge capacity in over 90 cities worldwide. Its CDN offering is supported by a peer-to-peer CDN overlay to expand capacity, and a load balancer to distribute traffic for multi-CDN architectures. The points of presence are located over all continents, as shown on this map.

Lumen has developed the edge capabilities of its global CDN through its partnership with Section.io. They now offer a flexible edge framework on which you can bring applications to boost performance, optimize websites and secure web assets (using external apps such as ThreatX, Perimeter X, etc.). They received a Frost & Sullivan Award for their web security offering in 2021.

CenturyLink small business 
CenturyLink Small Business provides products and services around Internet, Phone, TV, and Cloud Applications. Like CenturyLink Residential, CenturyLink Small Business offers DirecTV, but the residential and business packages are designed for the different settings.

CenturyLink residential 
CenturyLink Residential provides Internet (either DSL or Gigabit Fiber, depending on the package), voice, and TV, via partnership with DirecTV. The company also offers bundling with Verizon Wireless.

Availability by state 

CenturyLink residential services are available in the following states:

Arizona
Colorado
Florida
Idaho
Iowa
Kentucky
Minnesota
Montana
Nebraska
Nevada
New Mexico
North Dakota
Oregon
South Dakota
Utah
Washington
Wyoming
CenturyLink business services are available in the following states:

Arizona
Colorado
Florida
Idaho
Iowa
Kentucky
Minnesota
Montana
Nebraska
Nevada
New Mexico
North Dakota
Oregon
South Dakota
Utah
Washington
Wyoming

Fiber 
Quantum Fiber is a fiber to the premises service in the United States, providing broadband Internet to a small and fast growing number of locations. The service was first introduced to Omaha, Nebraska, and next rolled out to Las Vegas, Nevada, with plans for expansion to several other markets. Unlike the company's existing high speed Internet deployments, which utilize fiber-to the node/neighborhood to increase the speed of ADSL2+ speeds up to 20/2 Mbit/s, Vectored VDSL2+ speeds up to 140/10Mbit/s, in these markets CenturyLink now installs their fiber optic cable all the way to the home or business with speeds up to 1,000 Mbit/s download and 1,000 Mbit/s upload using Calix Optical Network Terminals. On February 2, 2014, CenturyLink announced the availability of Gigabit fiber service to multi-tenant businesses in Salt Lake City and surrounding communities. On August 5, 2014, CenturyLink announced the expansion of its gigabit fiber service to 16 additional markets. On September 15, 2015, CenturyLink announced the expansion of its gigabit fiber service to residential and business customers in six additional states, increasing the company's service coverage to select areas of 17 states.

Lumen maintains and operates dark fiber within the United States for the Department of Defense, contracting announcements indicate. This is a continuation of CenturyLink's work.

Gigabit Fiber markets

Data centers 
On May 2, 2017, CenturyLink, Inc. completed the previously announced sale of its data centers and colocation business to funds advised by BC Partners, in a consortium including Medina Capital Advisors and Longview Asset Management. The deal was worth approximately $1.86 billion, with CenturyLink retaining an approximately 10% equity stake in the consortium's newly formed global secure infrastructure company, Cyxtera Technologies.

Organizational structure 
As of 2018, Lumen is the second largest U.S. communications provider to global enterprise customers, second to Comcast. CenturyLink has customers in more than 60 countries and has been named one of America's best customer service companies (alongside Frontier and Spectrum).

Naming rights and sponsorships

Venue naming rights

Current
Lumen Field – Seattle, Washington (formerly Seahawks Stadium, Qwest Field, and CenturyLink Field)

Former
CenturyLink Arena Boise – Boise, Idaho (now Idaho Central Arena, formerly Bank of America Centre and Qwest Arena)
CenturyLink Center – Bossier City, Louisiana (now Brookshire Grocery Arena, formerly Bossier City Arena and CenturyTel Center)
CenturyLink Center Omaha – Omaha, Nebraska (now CHI Health Center Omaha, formerly Qwest Center Omaha)

Sponsorships
 Denver Broncos
 Orlando Magic
 Idaho Steelheads
 Seattle Seahawks
Texas Rangers
Tampa Bay Buccaneers
Minnesota Vikings
Portland Trail Blazers
ULM
LA Tech

Outages and other technical issues
The Federal Communications Commission ordered CenturyLink to pay a record $16 million for failing to alert authorities of a preventable programming error that left nearly 11 million people in seven states without access to emergency services for six hours in 2014.

In December 2018, CenturyLink faced criticism for requiring residential customers in Utah to, via DNS hijacking, view and acknowledge a notice advertising its security and parental control software, before they could connect to the internet again. The provider claimed that this was required by a recently enacted state law, which requires all ISPs to inform users that they provide "the ability to block material harmful to minors". Bill sponsor and Utah State Senate member Todd Weiler stated that the law did not require that service be disrupted until the notice is acknowledged; the law only requires that this notice be delivered in a "conspicuous" manner (such as an advertisement within a bill or invoice) and does not require disruption of service.

On December 27, 2018, a “nationwide outage” caused 9-1-1 service to be disrupted across the country. The Federal Communications Commission says it will investigate. In some areas the outage lasted nearly twelve hours and was the third shutdown of the year following outages in April and November 2018. ATM and point of sale credit card machines were also widely affected.

On January 8, 2020, CenturyLink was required to pay $8.9 million to customers in Minnesota in a settlement regarding over-billing. In addition to the payment, CenturyLink is required to reform billing practices and submit audits to the Minnesota Attorney General's office. According to reports, CenturyLink disagreed with the charges, but settled to avoid litigation costs.

On August 30, 2020, CenturyLink suffered a major technical outage due to misconfiguration in one of the company's data centers. The outage impacted tech giants such as Cloudflare, Amazon, Twitter, Xbox Live and many more. Reports indicate that all services were restored by 11:12 am ET.

See also
 List of CenturyLink operating companies
 List of United States telephone companies
 Tier 1 network

References

External links

 
 

 
1930 establishments in Tennessee
American companies established in 1930
Cloud computing providers
Cloud infrastructure
Companies based in Louisiana
Companies listed on the New York Stock Exchange
Internet service providers of the United States
Monroe, Louisiana
Pay telephone operators of the United States
Telecommunications companies established in 1930
Telecommunications companies of the United States
Tier 1 networks